Subir Al Cielo (English: Climb To The Sky) is the third studio album recorded by Puerto Rican boyband MDO. It was released by Sony Music Latin on October 31, 2000.

Original member Anthony Galindo left the band shortly before, and members Pablo Portillo and Troy Tuminelli were hired to replace him.

The album spawned the hit single "Te Quise Olvidar". It also featured three songs in English.

Track listing

Singles
 "Te Quise Olvidar"
 "Sin Ti"

Sales and certifications

Personnel

Pedro Alfonso – piano
Pete Amato – scat
Gustavo Arenas – arranger, producer
Richard Bravo – mixing, percussion
Ed Calle – baritone saxophone, tenor saxophone
Gustavo Celis – digital editing, engineer, vocal engineer
Tony Concepción – horn arrangements, trumpet
Mike Couzzi – mixing engineer, producer
Andrea Derby – production coordination
Jorge Dobal – horn
Jose Luis Galvis – assistant engineer
Al Hemberger – engineer
Julio Hernández – bass
Alejandro Jaén – producer, Spanish version
César Lemos – arranger, acoustic guitar, guitar programming, keyboard programming, keyboards, producer, programming
Lee Levin – drums
Óscar Llord – executive producer
Miami Symphonic orchestra – string ensemble
Alfredo Oliva – concertina
Carlos Paucar – engineer
Richie Pérez – engineer
Rudy Pérez – producer
Clay Perry – keyboards, programming
Elias Jr. Ponce	– assistant engineer, engineer
Cheito Quiñones – trumpet
Leo Quintero – acoustic guitar
Daniel Ramos – accordion, arranger, keyboards
Silvio Richetto – digital editing
Evan Rogers – producer
Carl Sturken – guitar, producer
Dana Teboe – trombone
Michael Hart thompson – guitar
Tommy Torres – drum programming, guitar, keyboards, mixing, producer
Adrian Trujillo – audio engineer
Camilo Valencia – arranger, horn arrangements, percussion
Rick Wake – producer
Dan Warner – electric guitar
Dave Way – mixing
Bruce Weeden – arranger, engineer, mixing, producer
Doc Wiley – engineer

Members
 Abel Talamantez
 Alexis Grullón
 Troy Curtis
 Didier Hernández
 Pablo Portillo

References

2000 albums
MDO (band) albums
Albums produced by Rudy Pérez
Albums produced by Tommy Torres
Sony Discos albums
Spanish-language albums